The Union County Academy for Performing Arts is a full-time four-year public magnet high school located in Scotch Plains, in Union County, New Jersey, United States, on the Union County Vocational Technical Schools Campus. Its first year was the 2008–2009 school year. While the school originally offered two majors; theatre and dance; a program in technical theatre was added in the 2015–2016 school year. The school is part of the Union County Vocational Technical Schools (UCVTS), which serves students in all of Union County. The school has been accredited by the Middle States Association of Colleges and Schools Commission on Elementary and Secondary Schools since 2017.

The students are on the Union County Vocational Technical Schools Campus for the first three years of high school, while their senior year is spent at Kean University. While attending Kean, their courses follow the program for the first year in the performing arts concentration.

As of the 2021–22 school year, the school had an enrollment of 234 students and 13.6 classroom teachers (on an FTE basis), for a student–teacher ratio of 17.2:1. There were 8 students (3.4% of enrollment) eligible for free lunch and 1 (0.4% of students) eligible for reduced-cost lunch.

Recognition and rankings
In 2016, the Academy for Performing Arts was one of ten schools in New Jersey, and one of two high school programs in the state, recognized as a National Blue Ribbon School by the United States Department of Education.

In its 2013 report on "America's Best High Schools", The Daily Beast ranked the school 962nd in the nation among participating public high schools and 71st among schools in New Jersey. In Newsweeks listing of "America's Best High Schools 2016", the school was ranked 203rd out of 500 best high schools in the country; it was ranked 32nd among all high schools in New Jersey.

Partnership with Kean University 
In addition to attending APA the first three years of high school, students are sent to Kean University during their senior year and are eligible to receive one full year of college credits on a Kean University transcript.

References

External links
Union County Academy for Performing Arts website

Academy for Performing Arts, National Center for Education Statistics

2008 establishments in New Jersey
Educational institutions established in 2008
Magnet schools in New Jersey
Public high schools in Union County, New Jersey
Scotch Plains, New Jersey